The Punjab Public Service Commission (PPSC), formerly known as the Joint Public Service Commission, is a government agency and topmost constitutional body of the Government of Punjab, India. It is responsible for  conducting civil services and competitive examinations to various civil services and departmental posts in the jurisdiction of Punjab, India.

History 
Punjab Public Service Commission was originally formed as Joint Public Service Commission at Lahore on 1 May 1937 before Partition of India. It was functioning under Khyber Pass and Yamuna River near Delhi. After British ended its governance in the country, the two newly independent countries India and Pakistan were born. In February, 1948, the two countries revised their provisions at Shimla that led the Punjab Public Service Commission to came into existence extending over the province of East Punjab. India, later merged Punjab and Patiala and East Punjab States Union that made the government to shift the commission to 
Patiala on 1 November 1956. The commission was working under PEPSU's jurisdiction. But on 1 November 1966, its territorial jurisdiction was decreased due to the formation of the States of Haryana and Himachal Pradesh and Indian-based commission came into existence by splitting the earlier formed commission in two constitutional bodies; one in India and another in Pakistan.

Functions and responsibilities
The commission is performing various roles as amended in Article 320 of the Constitution of India.
To conduct competitive and civil examinations under its present jurisdiction.
 To conducting screening test of the selected candidates.
To frame and operate schemes as amended in the state public service commission Article, 320 under the supervision of Union Public Service Commission, if state requests.
To make appointments to state civil services.
To check the suitability of the candidates when promoting and transferring them from one service to another.

Administration Profile
The state chief Secretary prepares the list of members and send it to state governor for their final appointments. State public service commission consists various members with different designations to perform their duties.

Commission censorship
In 2018, the selection process of the commission-members triggered controversies when News media reported questions raised by the leaders. The selection panel was cited arbitrary and possible political links behind the criteria for choosing members of the Punjab Public Service Commission.

See also
Punjab Public Service Commission (Pakistan)
 List of Public service commissions in India
 Punjab Educational Services

References 

1956 establishments in East Punjab
Government of Punjab, India
Civil Services of India